Mustapha Mesnaoui (1953 - November 17, 2015) was a Moroccan journalist, writer, and film critic.

Biography 
El Mesnaoui was born in 1953 in Casablanca. He studied at the Faculty of Letters and Humanities in Rabat. In 1974, he was imprisoned for two years for his political beliefs. In 1977, he obtained a degree and then a diploma of advanced studies in philosophy.

Death 
He died of a heart attack while attending the Cairo International Film Festival on November 17, 2015.

References 

Moroccan film critics

1953 births

2015 deaths